Mirzhan Beybutovich Rakhimzhanov (born August 18, 1983 in East Kazakhstan Province) is a male boxer from Kazakhstan. He competed for his native country at the 2004 Summer Olympics in Athens, Greece, where he was stopped in the second round of the men's flyweight division (– 51 kg) by Russia's Georgy Balakshin.

Rakhimzhanov qualified for the Athens Games by ending up in first place in the 2nd AIBA Asian 2004 Olympic Qualifying Tournament in Karachi, Pakistan. In the final he defeated Indonesia's Bonyx Yusak Saweho. He was a member of the Kazakhstan national team that competed at the 2005 Boxing World Cup in Moscow, Russia.

External links
 Profile

1983 births
Flyweight boxers
Living people
Boxers at the 2004 Summer Olympics
Olympic boxers of Kazakhstan
Kazakhstani male boxers
21st-century Kazakhstani people